The 1998 Cork Intermediate Hurling Championship was the 89th staging of the Cork Intermediate Hurling Championship since its establishment by the Cork County Board in 1909. The draw for the opening fixtures took place on 14 December 1997. The championship began on 20 June 1998 and ended on 8 November 1998.

On 8 November 1998, Castlelyons won the championship after a 2-12 to 2-09 defeat of Killeagh in the final at Páirc Uí Chaoimh. It was their first championship title in the grade.

Killeagh's Joe Deane was the championship's top scorer with 3-24.

Team changes

From Championship

Promoted to the Cork Senior Hurling Championship
 Cloyne

Regraded to the City Junior A Hurling Championship
 Bishopstown

To Championship

Promoted from the Cork Junior A Hurling Championship
 Castlelyons

Results

First round

Second round

Quarter-finals

Semi-finals

Final

Championship statistics

Top scorers

Overall

In a single game

References

Cork Intermediate Hurling Championship
Cork Intermediate Hurling Championship